Bully for You is the fourth studio album by Scottish musician BA Robertson, released on 27 March 1981 by Asylum Records. The album was not as successful as his previous album Initial Success, but managed to peak at number 61 on the UK Albums Chart. The album was reissued on CD on 12 May 2017 as an expanded edition by Cherry Red Records.

Release 
The two singles released from the album, "Flight 19" and "Saint Saens" were both commercial failures (although "Flight 19" did reach number 1 in Iceland), despite the fact that Robertson had an increased presence in the media since his debut album, with writing "Wired for Sound" for Cliff Richard, writing and performing the theme tune to the television series Maggie and co-hosting Top of the Pops. "Flight 19" is about the disappearance of the US aeroplanes in the Bermuda Triangle in 1945 and "Saint Saens" (which in the expanded edition of the album is written as Saint-Saëns) was originally titled "Sad Song", but was changed as a pun on the French composer.

Included with some releases of the album was a free 7" single titled "A Free B.A. From Middlesex Poly". The single was recorded live at Middlesex Polytechnic on 21 November 1980. The A-side "Sucker For Your Love" was recorded for the film The Monster Club in which Robertson starred.

The first bonus track of the extended version, "BAR's on 45" is a medley of his hits "Flight 19", "To Be or Not to Be", "Knocked It Off", "Kool in the Kaftan", "Saint Saens" and "Bang Bang" in the style of the songs by Stars on 45. "Swap Shop" is a demo of "Hello Hello", the theme tune to the television series Multi-Coloured Swap Shop. "Maggie Thatcher" is monologue performed by Sheila Steafel imitating former Prime Minister Margaret Thatcher. The last track "Saint-Saëns" is a medley which was performed at the Edinburgh Fringe Festival in 2004.

Track listing 

2017 bonus tracks:

Personnel 
Musicians

 BA Robertson – lead vocals, backing vocals, strings
 Terry Britten – backing vocals, guitar
 John Clark – additional guitar
 Alan Jones – bass guitar
 Dave Olney – additional bass guitar
 Graham Jarvis – drums
 Billy Livsey – keyboards
 Ken Freeman – additional keyboards
 Mike McNaught – additional piano, strings
 Graham Todd – additional piano

Technical

 John Hudson – engineer
 Bob Parr – assistant engineer
 Ian Walker – art direction
 Niall Doull-Connolly – photography
 Recorded at Mayfair Studios, London, with strings arranged at CTS Studios, London

Charts

References 

1981 albums
BA Robertson albums
Asylum Records albums